The 1992 World's Strongest Man was the 15th edition of World's Strongest Man and was won by Ted van der Parre from the Netherlands after finishing fourth the previous year. It was his first title. 1991 winner Magnus Ver Magnusson from Iceland finished second equal with 1989 winner Jamie Reeves from the United Kingdom. The contest was held in Reykjavík, Iceland.

Final results

References

External links
 Official site

World's Strongest
World's Strongest Man
1992 in Iceland